The Great Comet of 372–371 BC was a bright comet that is thought to possibly be the source of the Kreutz sungrazer family.

The Great Comet was observed by Aristotle, Ephorus, and Callisthenes. Ephorus reported that it split into two pieces: a larger fragment that is thought to have possibly returned in 1106 AD, as X/1106 C1, as well as another much smaller fragment. If it was the source of all Kreutz sungrazers observed up to date, it must have had a nucleus exceeding 120 km in diameter.

Observations
It was reported to have had a long, bright tail that had a reddish colour, as well as a nucleus brighter than any star in the night sky.

Aristotle wrote in Book 1 of Meteorologica

Quoting a lost source, Diodorus Siculus wrote that:

See also
 List of Kreutz Sungrazers
 Lists of comets
 Solar and Heliospheric Observatory

References

Further reading 
 Marsden B. G. (1989), The Sungrazing Comets Revisited, Asteroids, comets, meteors III, Proceedings of meeting (AMC 89), Uppsala: Universitet, 1990, eds C. I. Lagerkvist, H. Rickman, B. A. Lindblad., p. 393

External links 

Sungrazer project website 
SEDS Kreutz group page
Meteorology, translated by E. W. Webster (Alternate at mit.edu)

Comets
Great comets